The Parlin Library is a historic library building located at 210 East Chestnut Street in Canton, Illinois. The building was built in 1893-94 for the city's library; while the city had two library associations prior to then, both had failed and the city had no public library at the time. William Parlin, Sr., the founder of Canton's most prosperous business in the Parlin & Orendorff Company, bequeathed the money for the library in his estate when he died in 1890; his estate provided $8000 for the building and its collection, while an additional $5000 came from a library tax. The Peoria architectural firm of Richardson & Salter designed the Richardsonian Romanesque library. The library's collection included 1,000 books when it opened, a figure which increased to 8,000 by 1908; it also included a large art gallery. The library served in its original capacity until 1958, when a new library opened and the old building became Canton's city hall.

The library was added to the National Register of Historic Places in 1994. It is one of four sites on the Register in Canton; the others are the Chicago, Burlington & Quincy Railroad Station, the Ulysses G. Orendorff House and the Orendorf Site.

Notes

External links
 Canton Library History from the current Parlin-Ingersoll Library

Library buildings completed in 1894
Canton, Illinois
Libraries on the National Register of Historic Places in Illinois
National Register of Historic Places in Fulton County, Illinois
Buildings and structures in Fulton County, Illinois